The Autonomous Province of Kosovo and Metohija, commonly known as Kosovo and abbreviated to Kosmet or KiM, is an autonomous province defined by the Constitution of Serbia that occupies the southernmost part of Serbia. The territory is the subject of an ongoing political and territorial dispute between Republic of Serbia and the partially recognised, self-proclaimed Republic of Kosovo, the latter of which has control over the region. Its claimed administrative capital and largest city is Pristina.

The territory of the province, as recognized by Serbian laws, lies in the southern part of Serbia and covers the regions of Kosovo and Metohija. The capital of the province is Pristina. The territory was previously an autonomous province of Serbia during Socialist Yugoslavia (1946–1990), and acquired its current status in 1990. The province was governed as part of Serbia until the Kosovo War (1998–99), when it became a United Nations (UN) protectorate in accordance with United Nations Security Council Resolution 1244, but still internationally recognized as part of Serbia. The control was then transferred to the UN administration of UNMIK. On 17 February 2008, representatives of the people of Kosovo unilaterally and extra-institutionally declared Kosovo's independence, which is internationally recognized by 101 UN members, but not by Serbia, which still regards it as its province. On 22 July 2010 the International Court of Justice (ICJ) concluded that "the declaration of independence of Kosovo adopted on 17 February 2008 did not violate international law".

Overview 
In 1990, the Socialist Autonomous Province of Kosovo, an autonomous province of Serbia within Yugoslavia, had undergone the anti-bureaucratic revolution by Slobodan Milošević's government which resulted in the reduction of its powers, effectively returning it to its constitutional status of 1971–74. The same year, its Albanian majority—as well as the Republic of Albania—supported the proclamation of an independent Republic of Kosova. Following the end of the Kosovo War 1999, and as a result of NATO intervention, Serbia and the federal government no longer exercised de facto control over the territory.

In February 2008, the Republic of Kosovo declared independence. While Serbia has not recognised Kosovo's independence, in the 2013 Brussels Agreement, it abolished all its institutions in the Autonomous Province. , Kosovo's independence is currently recognized by  UN member states. In 2013, the Serbian government announced it was dissolving the Serb minority assemblies it had created in northern Kosovo, in order to allow the integration of the Kosovo Serb minority into the general population of Kosovo.

History 

Constitutional changes were made in Yugoslavia in 1990. The parliaments of all Yugoslavian republics and provinces, which until then had MPs only from the League of Communists of Yugoslavia, were dissolved and multi-party elections were held within them. Kosovar Albanians refused to participate in the elections so they held their own unsanctioned elections instead. As election laws required (and still require) turnout higher than 50%, a parliament in Kosovo could not be established.

The new constitution abolished the individual provinces' official media, integrating them within the official media of Serbia while still retaining some programs in the Albanian language. The Albanian-language media in Kosovo were suppressed. Funding was withdrawn from state-owned media, including those in the Albanian language in Kosovo. The constitution made the creation of privately owned media possible, however their operation was very difficult because of high rents and restrictive laws. State-owned Albanian language television or radio was also banned from broadcasting from Kosovo. However, privately owned Albanian media outlets appeared; of these, probably the most famous is "Koha Ditore", which was allowed to operate until late 1998 when it was closed after publishing a calendar glorifying ethnic Albanian separatists.

The constitution also transferred control over state-owned companies to the Yugoslav central government. In September 1990, up to 123,000 Albanian workers were dismissed from their positions in government and media, as were teachers, doctors, and civil servants, provoking a general strike and mass unrest. Some of those who were not sacked quit in sympathy, refusing to work for the Serbian government. Although the sackings were widely seen as a purge of ethnic Albanians, the government maintained that it was removing former communist directors.

Albanian educational curriculum textbooks were withdrawn and replaced by new ones. The curriculum was (and still is, as this is the curriculum used for Albanians in Serbia outside Kosovo) identical to its Serbian counterpart and that of all other nationalities in Serbia except that it had education on and in the Albanian language. Education in Albanian was withdrawn in 1992 and re-established in 1994. At the University of Pristina, which was seen as a centre of Kosovo Albanian cultural identity, education in the Albanian language was abolished and Albanian teachers were also dismissed in large numbers. Albanians responded by boycotting state schools and setting up an unofficial parallel system of Albanian-language education.

Kosovo Albanians were outraged by what they saw as an attack on their rights. Following mass rioting and unrest from Albanians as well as outbreaks of inter-communal violence, in February 1990, a state of emergency was declared and the presence of the Yugoslav Army and police was significantly increased to quell the unrest.

Unsanctioned elections were held in 1992, which overwhelmingly elected Ibrahim Rugova as "president" of a self-declared Republic of Kosova; Serb authorities rejected the election results, and tried to capture and prosecute those who had voted. In 1995, thousands of Serb refugees from Croatia were settled in Kosovo, which further worsened relations between the two communities.

Albanian opposition to the sovereignty of Yugoslavia and especially Serbia had previously surfaced in rioting (1968 and March 1981) in the capital Pristina. Rugova initially advocated non-violent resistance, but later opposition took the form of separatist agitation by opposition political groups and armed action from 1995 by the "Kosovo Liberation Army" (Ushtria Çlirimtare e Kosovës, or UÇK) whose activities led to the Insurgency in Kosovo which led to the Kosovo War in 1998 ending with the 1999 NATO bombing of the Federal Republic of Yugoslavia and establishment of the United Nations Interim Administration Mission in Kosovo (UNMIK).

In 2003, the Federal Republic of Yugoslavia was renamed the State Union of Serbia and Montenegro (Montenegro left the federation in 2006 and recognised Kosovo's independence in 2008).

Politics

Since 1999, the Serb-inhabited areas of Kosovo have been governed as a de facto independent region from the Albanian-dominated government in Pristina. They continue to use Serbian national symbols and participate in Serbian national elections, which are boycotted in the rest of Kosovo; in turn, they boycott Kosovo's elections. The municipalities of Leposavić, Zvečan and Zubin Potok are run by local Serbs, while the Kosovska Mitrovica municipality had rival Serbian and Albanian governments until a compromise was agreed in November 2002.

The Serb areas have united into a community, the Union of Serbian Districts and District Units of Kosovo and Metohija established in February 2003 by Serbian delegates meeting in North Mitrovica, which has since served as the de facto "capital." The Union's president is Dragan Velić. There is also a central governing body, the Serbian National Council for Kosovo and Metohija (SNV). The President of SNV in North Kosovo is Dr Milan Ivanović, while the head of its Executive Council is Rada Trajković.

Local politics are dominated by the Serbian List for Kosovo and Metohija. The Serbian List was led by Oliver Ivanović, an engineer from Kosovska Mitrovica.

In February 2007 the Union of Serbian Districts and District Units of Kosovo and Metohija has transformed into the Serbian Assembly of Kosovo and Metohija presided by Marko Jakšić. The Assembly strongly criticised the secessionist movements of the Albanian-dominated PISG Assembly of Kosovo and demanded unity of the Serb people in Kosovo, boycott of EULEX and announced massive protests in support of Serbia's sovereignty over Kosovo. On 18 February 2008, day after Kosovo's unilateral declaration of independence, the Assembly declared it "null and void".

Also, there was a Ministry for Kosovo and Metohija within the Serbian government, with Goran Bogdanović as Minister for Kosovo and Metohija. In 2012, that ministry was downgraded to the Office for Kosovo and Metohija, with Aleksandar Vulin as the head of the new office. However, in 2013, the post was raised to that of a Minister without portfolio in charge of Kosovo and Metohija.

Administrative divisions 

Under the Serbian system of administration, Kosovo is divided into five districts comprising 28 municipalities and 1 city. In 2000, UNMIK established a system with 7 districts and 30 municipalities. Serbia has not exercised effective control over Kosovo since July 1999. For the UNMIK created districts of Kosovo, see Districts of Kosovo.

See also 

 North Kosovo
 Republic of Serbia (1992–2006)
 Serbian enclaves in Kosovo
 Vojvodina

Annotations

References

External links
 Office for the Autonomous Province of Kosovo and Metohija, Government of Serbia

 
Kosovo and Metohija
Kosovo and Metohija
States and territories established in 1992
Albanian-speaking countries and territories
Serbian-speaking countries and territories
History of Kosovo
Historical regions in Serbia
Serbia and Montenegro
1992 establishments in Kosovo
Kosovo–Serbia relations